Thirty-eight Infantry Bluff is a cliff along the Nisqually River in the U.S. state of Washington.

Thirty-eight Infantry Bluff was named in honor of the 38th Infantry Regiment (United States), for its role in World War I.

References

Cliffs of the United States
Landforms of Thurston County, Washington